When the Song Does Not End (Russian: Когда песня не кончается) is a 1964 Soviet musical film-revue, directed by Roman Tikhomirov and produced by the Leningrad Film Studio. It features music by Andrey Petrov, Georgi Portnov, Vasily Solovyov-Sedoi, Viktor Fyodorov, and Georgy Firtich. Among other things, it is notable for being Edita Piekha's screen début.

Synopsis 
During the Leningrad summer music festival, a young police lieutenant falls in love with Svetlana, a beautiful singer. Meanwhile, reporters Kostya and Bob do their best to document the various musical performances.

Cast 
 Aleksandr Bronevitskiy
 Muslim Magomayev
 Georg Ots
 Edita Piekha, as Svetlana
 Arkady Raykin
 Lyudmila Zykina

References

External links 

 When the Song Does Not End on kino-teatr.ru

Soviet musical films
1960s Russian-language films
1964 films
Films about music festivals